(2019)

Bouhmama is a district in Khenchela Province, Algeria. It was named after its capital, Bouhmama.

Municipalities
The district is further divided into 4 municipalities:
Bouhmama
Chelia 
Yabous
M'Sara

Districts of Khenchela Province